The Teatro Broadway  is an Art Deco style theatre in Buenos Aires, Argentina which opened on October 11, 1930.

Located near the centre of the city at 1155 Corrientes Avenue, it was designed by the architect Jorge Kálnay.

History
Built grounds Gourdy family by the German company Wayss and Freytag, was inaugurated on October 11, 1930 by the company A. Alvarez & Co., in a boom period film in Argentina, where the old theaters had to adapt to the changes for both plays and film screenings. The film premiered that day was The Underwater Tragedy Seal 20th. Century Fox. Born as Broadway movie theater, but currently is only theater, and specializes in works magazine. Until 1939, under the direction of Alvarez was living the Broadway premiere of the major American labels, including the MGM (Metro Goldwyn Mayer), 20th. Century Fox, Paramount and Columbia until 1935 and film produced domestically.

The roof of the original single room was so paraboloid, helping to provide excellent acoustics, without echoes or reverberations, and helping to improve the air circulation space. He had an overhang of 12 meters above the audience, innovative central air conditioning and room for 2265 people.

The October 19, 1931, Carlos Gardel sang this season theatre. In 1942, the hall was dedicated exclusively to Argentine films. The sound system was modernized in 1954, while the new system was inaugurated with Cinemascope movie The mantle sagrado. Like many theaters, the only room was divided in two. The top eight floors were originally intended for rental housing and a small confectionery, and beams were used Vierendel 18 meter span to support the roof of the theater space, which has no columns.

In 1999, the show businessman Alejandro Romay took over the Broadway Theatre, performing a work of modernization. The upper floors were converted into a hotel complex called "Broadway Hotel & Suites".

Principal concerts

References

External links
Broadway-suites official site 

Theatres in Buenos Aires
Buildings and structures completed in 1930
Theatres completed in 1930
Art Deco architecture in Argentina